Florio Bustron (1500s - post-1568, perhaps 1570), was a 16th century administrator, jurist and historian. Florio became a prominent administrative figure when Cyprus was under Venetian rule. He came from a family possibly of Syrian origin, with Greek and Latinised members. According to John Sozomenos who described the siege of Nicosia by the Ottomans in 1570, he died during the Turkish invasion. His work Historia overo commentarii de Cipro was written in Italian prose. A part of his chronicle concerns the final years of the Kingdom of Cyprus with the internal crisis between Queen Charlotte and James the Bastard. He was related to another Cypriot chronicler, Georgios Boustronios, Florio based part of his narrative to the earlier chronicle by Georgios, their chronicles both end in 1489. Florio Bustron also makes one of the earliest references to Halloumi (in Italian, ‘calumi’) made from a mixture of sheep’s and goat’s milk. The chronicle was later published by René de Mas Latrie, son of the French Historian Luis de Mas Latrie and it was reprinted in 1998 in Nicosia.

Publications 

 Chronique de l'Île de Chypre. Par Florio Bustron. Publiée par M. René de Mas Latrie. 1884

See also 

 Kingdom of Cyprus
 Venetian Cyprus
 Leontios Machairas
 Georgios Boustronios
 Chronicle of ‘Amadi’
Stefano Lusignan

References 

Chroniclers
16th-century writers
Cypriot non-fiction writers
Cypriot historians
People of the Kingdom of Cyprus
16th-century births
16th-century deaths